Royal Flush is an album by American trumpeter Donald Byrd featuring Byrd with Pepper Adams, Herbie Hancock, Butch Warren, and Billy Higgins recorded in 1961 and released on the Blue Note label as BLP 4101. The album is notable for being pianist Herbie Hancock's first Blue Note session to be released.

Reception
The Allmusic review by Stephen Thomas Erlewine awarded the album 3 stars and stated "For the most part, the quintet plays a set of vital hard bop... But what's really interesting is when they begin pushing the boundaries".

Track listing
All compositions by Donald Byrd except as indicated

 "Hush" - 6:24
 "I'm a Fool to Want You" (Joel Herron, Frank Sinatra, Jack Wolf) - 6:15
 "Jorgie's" - 8:07
 "Shangri-La" - 6:37
 "6M's" - 6:30
 "Requiem" (Hancock) - 7:07

Personnel
Donald Byrd - trumpet
Pepper Adams - baritone saxophone - except track 2
Herbie Hancock - piano
Butch Warren - bass
Billy Higgins - drums

References

1962 albums
Albums produced by Alfred Lion
Albums recorded at Van Gelder Studio
Blue Note Records albums
Donald Byrd albums